Lar Rural District is in Laran District of Shahrekord County, Chaharmahal and Bakhtiari province, Iran. At the census of 2006, its population was 13,824 in 3,159 households; there were 13,877 inhabitants in 3,695 households at the following census of 2011; and in the most recent census of 2016, the population of the rural district was 9,075 in 2,739 households. The largest of its eight villages was Khvoy, with 2,772 people.

References 

Shahrekord County

Rural Districts of Chaharmahal and Bakhtiari Province

Populated places in Chaharmahal and Bakhtiari Province

Populated places in Shahr-e Kord County